Achasanseong Fortress is an earthen mountain fortress of the Korean Three Kingdoms period.  Originally built by Baekje, it was occupied in turn by each of the Three Kingdoms.  It stands on Achasan Mountain, in Gwangjin-gu, Seoul, South Korea, at an altitude of 200 meters above sea level.  It has a perimeter of roughly 1 kilometer and an area of about 3375 m².  

The first mention of this fortress in historical records comes from the Samguk Sagi's statement that King Chaekgye of Baekje ordered it to be fortified against an expected Goguryeo invasion.  At that time, Achasanseong Fortress would have played a key role in the defense of the Baekje capital Hanseong from the north.  

In 475, Goguryeo overran this and the other defenses of Baekje, and King Gaero of Baekje was brought to Acha and executed.  The fortress and the rest of the Han River valley were conquered by Silla in 553.  The Goguryeo general Ondal later died here while trying to reclaim the fortress.

Achasanseong Fortress was designated as a historic landmark in 1973, and has since become a common local tourist destination.

See also
 History of Korea
 Castles in Korea

External links
Tourist information from the Gwangjin-gu district government

Gwangjin District
Archaeological sites in South Korea
Castles in South Korea